Lawrence Sam “Larry” Goldings (born August 28, 1968) is an American jazz keyboardist and composer. His music has explored elements of funk, blues, and fusion.  Goldings has a comedic alter ego known as Hans Groiner.

Life and career
Goldings was born in Boston. His father was a classical music enthusiast, and Goldings studied classical piano until the age of twelve. While in high school at Concord Academy, he attended a program at the Eastman School of Music. During this period Erroll Garner, Oscar Peterson, Dave McKenna, Red Garland, and Bill Evans were influences. As a young teenager, Goldings studied privately with Ran Blake and Keith Jarrett.

Goldings moved to New York City in 1986 to attend a newly formed jazz program under the leadership of Arnie Lawrence at The New School. During college he studied piano with Jaki Byard and Fred Hersch. While still a freshman Roland Hanna invited Goldings to accompany him to a three-day private jazz party in Copenhagen. While there Goldings met jazz legends Sarah Vaughan, Kenny Burrell, Tommy Flanagan, and Hank Jones; and he also played piano in a band with Vaughan, Harry "Sweets" Edison, and Al Cohn. While still a college student, he embarked on a worldwide tour with Jon Hendricks and worked with him for a year. A collaboration lasting almost three years with jazz guitarist Jim Hall followed.

In 1988, Goldings began his development as an organist during a regular gig at a piano-less bar called Augie's Jazz Bar (now Smoke) on New York's Upper West Side. He was featured with several bands, and his own trio with guitarist Peter Bernstein and drummer Bill Stewart got its start there. His first release was Intimacy of the Blues in 1991.

Over the course of his career, his distinctive keyboard sound has been sought out by pop, jazz, R&B, Brazilian, and alternative artists including De La Soul, India.Arie, Tracy Chapman, Madeleine Peyroux, Melody Gardot, Michael McDonald, Beck, Walter Becker, Steve Gadd, Leon Russell, Rickie Lee Jones, Sia, John Mayer, Herbie Hancock, and Norah Jones.

Record producers he has worked with include Russ Titelman, Larry Klein, Steve Jordan, Tommy LiPuma, Dave Grusin, Joe Henry, Blake Mills, Mike Viola, and T Bone Burnett. One of Goldings' first collaborations with Larry Klein includes the Madeleine Peyroux recording of Leonard Cohen's "Dance Me to the End of Love" with Goldings on Wurlitzer piano, pump organ, Hammond B3 organ, celeste, and piano solo.

He has collaborated with musicians such as Maceo Parker, John Scofield, Carla Bley, Michael Brecker and Pat Metheny, John Pizzarelli, Jack DeJohnette, Anthony Wilson and Jim Keltner, Mike Viola, and Charlie Haden in genres including jazz, Brazilian, and funk. He performs pop music as a pianist (since 2001) for singer-songwriter James Taylor.

Goldings is known for his gifts as a bass player on the Hammond organ, integral to his collaboration with Michael Brecker and Pat Metheny on Time is of the Essence and evident in the Pat Metheny composition "Extradition" during their 1999–2000 world tour. James Taylor's One Man Band 2007 live album and world tour draws heavily on Goldings' bass playing abilities, making the one man band concept possible. The album and tour also include Goldings' composition "School Song."  Larry Goldings' Hammond organ is heard on John Mayer's song "Gravity," on the Grammy award-winning album, Continuum.

In 2007, Larry Goldings, Jack DeJohnette and John Scofield received a Grammy Award nomination in the category of Best Jazz Instrumental Album Individual or Group for their live album, Trio Beyond - Saudades. In 2017, Goldings with the Steve Gadd Band received a Grammy nomination in the category of Best Contemporary Instrumental Album for Way Back Home.

In 2012 and 2013, Goldings was chosen to participate in both the Sundance Institute Documentary Film and Sundance Feature Film Composer Fellowship Programs. At the Documentary Film Lab in Sundance, Utah, Goldings scored scenes from filmmaker Johanna Hamilton's "1971." Goldings continued to work with the Sundance Institute in 2013, at the feature film lab held for the first time at Skywalker Ranch in Marin County. There he collaborated with filmmaker Pamela Romanowsky, scoring scenes from her film The Adderall Diaries. Goldings' advisors in that program included noted film composers Mark Isham, Heitor Pereira, Harry Gregson-Williams, and Thomas Newman.

Style and influences 
Goldings' melodic style of organ playing has often been compared to that of Larry Young. On organ Goldings cites as his first inspirations the solo piano style of Dave McKenna "who walks his own bass lines better than anyone" and Billy Preston accompanying Aretha Franklin on "Bridge Over Troubled Water." Other musical influences cited by Goldings include the Wes Montgomery records which feature Mel Rhyne and Jimmy Smith; Shirley Scott; Chester Thompson; Joe Zawinul; and Jack McDuff. Goldings' 1990s collaborations with Maceo Parker provided an authentic understanding of the language of funk music, and the voicings and rhythmic comping on the Hammond B3 organ as passed down by James Brown to Parker.

Awards and honors
 Best Jazz Album of the Year, The New Yorker, Big Stuff (1996), Awareness (1997)
 Organist/Keyboardist of the Year, Jazz Journalists Association, 2000, 2001
 Grammy Award Nomination, Best Jazz Album of the Year, 2007
 Grammy Award Nomination, Best Contemporary Instrumental Album, 2017
 Best Jazz Song, "High Dreams," John Lennon Songwriting Competition, 2019

Discography

As leader/co-leader

Main sources:

As sideman
With Peter Bernstein
 Brain Dance (Criss Cross, 1996)
 Earth Tones (Criss Cross, 1998)

With Till Brönner
 Oceana (EmArcy, 2006)
 Rio (Verve, 2008)
 At the End of the Day (Bam Bam, 2010)
 The Good Life (Masterworks, 2016)

With Chris Minh Doky
 Listen Up! (Virgin, 2000)
 Cinematique (Blue Note/Capitol, 2002)
 Scenes from a Dream (Red Dot, 2010)

With Sia
 Colour the Small One (Astralwerks, 2004)
 Some People Have Real Problems (Hear Music, 2008)

With Robben Ford
 Truth (Concord, 2007)
 Soul on Ten (Concord, 2009)
 Bringing It Back Home (Provogue, 2013)

With Steve Gadd
 Gadditude (BFM, 2013)
 Steve Gadd Band 70 Strong (BFM, 2015)
 Way Back Home (BFM, 2016)
 Steve Gadd Band (BFM, 2018)

With Melody Gardot
 My One and Only Thrill (Verve, 2009)
 The Absence (Decca, 2012)
 Currency of Man (Decca, 2015)

With Jesse Harris
 Mineral (Secret Sun, 2006)
 No Wrong No Right (Dangerbird, 2015)

With Jim Hall
 Subsequently (MusicMasters, 1992)
 Something Special (MusicMasters/Limelight, 1993)

With Colin Hay
 Company of Strangers (Lazy Eye, 2002)
 Are You Lookin' at Me? (Compass/Lazy Eye, 2007)
 Next Year People (Compass/Lazy Eye, 2015)

With Adam Levy
 Buttermilk Channel (Lost Wax, 2001)
 Town & Country (Lost Wax, 2014)

With John Mayer
 Continuum (Columbia, 2006)
 The Search for Everything (Columbia, 2017)

With Jessica Molaskey
 Make Believe (PS Classics, 2003)
 Sitting in Limbo (PS Classics, 2007)
 Portraits of Joni (Ghostlight, 2017)

With James Moody
 Young at Heart (Warner Bros., 1996)
 Warner Jams Vol. 2: The Two Tenors (Warner Bros., 1997)

With Maceo Parker
 Roots Revisited (Verve, 1990)
 Mo' Roots (Verve, 1991)
 Life on Planet Groove (Verve, 1992)

With Rebecca Pidgeon
 Behind the Velvet Curtain (Great American Music, 2008)
 Bad Poetry (Toy Canteen, 2014)

With Madeleine Peyroux
 Careless Love (Rounder, 2004)
 Half the Perfect World (Rounder, 2006)
 Bare Bones (Rounder/Decca, 2008)
 The Blue Room (Decca/EmArcy, 2012)

With John Pizzarelli
 Double Exposure (Telarc, 2012)
 Midnight McCartney (Concord, 2015)

With Tim Ries
 Alternate Side (Criss Cross, 2001)
 The Rolling Stones Project (Concord, 2005)

With Lee Ritenour
 6 String Theory (Concord, 2010)
 Rhythm Sessions (Concord, 2012)

With John Scofield
 Hand Jive (Blue Note, 1994)
 Groove Elation (Blue Note, 1995)
 Steady Groovin (Blue Note, 2000, compilation)
 That's What I Say (Verve, 2005)
 A Moment's Peace (EmArcy, 2011)
 Country for Old Men (Impulse!, 2016)

With Mark Sholtez
 The Distance Between Two Truths (Warner, 2010)
 The Edge of the Known World (Ambition, 2015)

With Bill Stewart
 Incandescence (Pirouet, 2008)
 Live at Smalls (Smallslive, 2011)
 Ramshackle Serenade (Pirouet, 2014)
 Toy Tunes (Pirouet, 2018)

With Curtis Stigers
 Baby Plays Around (Concord Jazz, 2001)
 Secret Heart (Concord Jazz, 2002)
 You Inspire Me (Concord Jazz, 2003) (As sideman & producer)
 I Think It's Going To Rain Today (Concord Jazz, 2005) (As sideman & producer)
 Real Emotional (Concord Jazz, 2007) (As sideman & producer)
 Lost In Dreams (Concord Jazz, 2009)
 Let's Go Out Tonight (Concord Jazz, 2012)

With Dave Stryker
 Blue Degrees (1993)
 Shades of Miles (SteepleChase, 2000)

With James Taylor
 October Road (Columbia, 2002)
 A Christmas Album (Hallmark, 2004)
 One Man Band (Hear Music, 2007)
 Other Covers (Hear Music, 2009)
 Before This World (Concord, 2015)
 American Standard (Fantasy, 2020)

With Matt Wilson
 As Wave Follows Wave (Palmetto, 1996)
 Arts and Crafts (Palmetto, 2001)

With Lazlo Bane
 All the Time in the World (2002)
 Guilty Pleasures (2007)

With others
 Casey Abrams, Casey Abrams (Concord, 2012)
 Priscilla Ahn, A Good Day (Blue Note, 2008)
 Harry Allen, Christmas in Swingtime (2001)
 Herb Alpert, The Christmas Wish (2017)
 India Arie, Acoustic Soul (Motown, 2001)
 Walter Becker, Circus Money (5 Over 12, Mailboat 2008)
 Bob Belden, When Doves Cry (Metro Blue, 1994)
 Carla Bley, 4x4 (ECM, 2000)
 Don Braden, Organic (Epicure, 1995)
 Michael Brecker, Time Is of the Essence (Verve, 1999)
 Brian Bromberg, Compared to That (Artistry Music, 2012)
 Tom Browne, Another Shade of Browne (Hip Bop Essence, 1996)
 Michael Buble, Nobody but Me (Reprise, 2016)
 Dewa Budjana, Joged Kahyangan (Moonjune, 2013)
 Gary Burton, Six Pack (GRP, 1992)
 Chiara Civello, Last Quarter Moon (Verve Forecast, 2005)
 Holly Cole, Holly (2018)
 Luis Conte, En Casa de Luis (BFM, 2011)
 Nataly Dawn, How I Knew Her (Nonesuch, 2013)
 Lea DeLaria, Play It Cool (Warner Bros., 2001)
 Kat Edmonson, Way Down Low (Okeh/Masterworks, 2013)
 Mark Eitzel, Don't Be a Stranger (Decor 2012)
 Dominick Farinacci, Short Stories (Mack Avenue, 2016)
 Steve Gadd, Gadditude (BFM, 2013)
 Sara Gazarek, Blossom & Bee (Palmetto, 2012)
 Herbie Hancock, The Imagine Project (Sony, 2010)
 Jon Hendricks, Freddie Freeloader (Denon, 1990)
 Benjamin Herman, Get In (A-, 1999)
 Christopher Hollyday, On Course (Novus, 1990)
 Satoshi Inoue, Plays Satoshi (Paddle Wheel, 1996)
 Jacintha, Jacintha Goes to Hollywood (Groove Note, 2007)
 Javon Jackson, Pleasant Valley (Blue Note, 1999)
 Al Jarreau, Accentuate the Positive (Verve, 2004)
 Elton John, The Diving Board (Mercury, 2013)
 Norah Jones, Not Too Late (Blue Note, 2006)
 Rickie Lee Jones, The Devil You Know (Concord, 2012)
 Michael Landau, Organic Instrumentals (Tone Center, 2012)
 Hugh Laurie, Didn't It Rain (Warner Bros., 2013)
 John Legend, Darkness and Light (Columbia, 2016)
 Kevyn Lettau, Bye-Bye Blackbird (MCG, 2005)
 Lisa Loeb, The Way It Really Is (Zoe, 2004)
 Lisa Loeb, Lullaby Girl (Furious Rose Productions, 2017) (as co-leader and producer)
 Joe Magnarelli, Always There (Criss Cross, 1997)
 Kevin Mahogany, Kevin Mahogany (Warner Bros., 1996)
 Arnold McCuller, Soon As I Get Paid (What's Good, 2011)
 Michael McDonald, Wide Open (Chonin, BMG 2017)
 Vince Mendoza, Nights on Earth (Art of Groove, 2011)
 Lea Michele, Louder (Columbia/Sony, 2014)
 Bette Midler, It's the Girls! (EastWest/Warner Bros., 2014)
 Bob Mintzer, Canyon Cove (2010)
 Jane Monheit, Home (EmArcy, 2010)
 Jane Monheit, The Heart of the Matter (2013)
 Gaby Moreno, Ilusíon (2016)
 Ronald Muldrow, Gnowing You (Bellaphon, L+R 1991)
 Alexi Murdoch, Four Songs (2002)
 Leona Naess, Thirteens (Verve Forecast, 2008)
 Josh Nelson, The Sky Remains (Origin, 2017)
 Chris Potter, Pure (Concord Jazz, 1995)
 Bobby Previte, Hue and Cry (Enja, 1994)
 Eros Ramazzotti, Ali e radici (Sony/RCA 2009)
 Jim Rotondi, Introducing Jim Rotondi (Criss Cross, 1997)
 Leon Russell, Life Journey (Universal, 2014)
 David Sanborn, Closer (Verve, 2005)
 Judi Silvano, Songs I Wrote or Wish I Did (JSL, 2000)
 Luciana Souza, Tide (Verve, 2009)
 John Stein, Portraits and Landscapes (Jardis, 2000)
 Rod Stewart, Fly Me to the Moon... The Great American Songbook Volume V (Sony, 2010)
 Tierney Sutton, After Blue (BFM, 2013)
 Nedelle Torrisi, Only for You (Frenchkiss, 2018)
 Doug Webb, Swing Shift (Posi-Tone, 2011)
 Noam Weinstein, Clocked (2012)
 Walt Weiskopf, A World Away (Criss Cross, 1995)
 Jacob Young, This Is You (NorCD, 1995)
 Adam Czerwiński & Darek Oleszkiewicz, Raindance (AC Records 2006)
 Anthony Wilson, Jack of Hearts (Groove Note, 2009)
 Lyle Workman, Harmonic Crusader (Infrared, 2009)
 Nikki Yanofsky, Nikki (Decca, 2010)

Film and TV credits
 2020 Self Made:  Inspired by the Life of Madam C.J. Walker (TV series composer)
 2016 The Founder (soundtrack featuring "In Spite of Everything" composed and performed by Larry Goldings)
 2015 Trainwreck (soundtrack featuring "The Morning After" composed and performed by Larry Goldings)
 2014 Neighbors (soundtrack featuring "Tanglefoot Bounce" composed and performed by Larry Goldings)
 2014 Good Morning America and Walmart Soundcheck (featuring "Battlefield" an original composition performed by Lea Michele)
 2013 The Mark of Beauty (featuring "Strays" an original composition performed by Larry Goldings)
 2013 Dealing With Idiots (film composer)
 2009 The Dream's on Me (featured in film and on soundtrack)
 2009 Funny People (featuring "Memory" performed by Larry Goldings and Maude Apatow, and  "Tuscany" (originally titled "Dario and Bario"), an original composition performed by Larry Goldings)
 2008 Bernard and Doris (HBO) (soundtrack featuring performance by Larry Goldings )
 2008 The Office (NBC) (soundtrack featuring performance by Larry Goldings)
 2008 Great Performances on PBS:  James Taylor:  One Man Band (featuring Larry Goldings as "One Man Band" and "School Song" an original composition performed by Larry Goldings)
 2005 Proof (soundtrack featuring "Uganda," an original composition performed by Larry Goldings)
 2000 Space Cowboys (soundtrack featuring several arrangements of jazz standards performed by Larry Goldings)

References

External links
 Official site
 All About Jazz Interview with Larry Goldings
 Songwriting, Producing, and Performing Credits 

1968 births
Living people
American jazz composers
American male jazz composers
American jazz pianists
American male pianists
American jazz organists
American male organists
Musicians from Boston
Palmetto Records artists
Concord Academy alumni
20th-century American pianists
Jazz musicians from Massachusetts
21st-century American pianists
21st-century organists
20th-century American male musicians
21st-century American male musicians
21st-century American keyboardists
Trio Beyond members
20th-century American keyboardists
ECM Records artists
Pirouet Records artists
Verve Records artists
Warner Records artists
Novus Records artists